The RP20CD is a diesel-electric road switcher locomotive built by Railpower Technologies.  It is a "genset" locomotive, having three engine-generator sets. 

The engines are computer controlled, with the computer stopping and starting engines on a rotating basis, as required to produce the horsepower needed at any given moment.

It has six-wheel (three-axle) trucks, rather than the usual four-wheel (two-axle) trucks commonly found on smaller, lighter, switcher locomotives.

References 

C-C locomotives
Diesel-electric locomotives of the United States
Railpower locomotives
EPA Tier 2-compliant locomotives of the United States
Rebuilt locomotives
Standard gauge locomotives of the United States
Railway locomotives introduced in 2008